Sammon may refer to:

People
Sammon (surname), notable persons with the surname Sammon

Other
Jimon and Sammon, one of the factions of Tendai Buddhism
Sammon projection, an algorithm that maps a high-dimensional space to a space of lower dimensionality